Neoregelia martinellii is a species of flowering plant in the genus Neoregelia. This species is endemic to Brazil.

Cultivars
 Neoregelia 'Antlers'

References
Bromeliaceae Da Mata Atlantica Brasileira retrieved 22 October 2009
BSI Cultivar Registry Retrieved 11 October 2009

martinellii
Flora of Brazil